Baladiyah is a type of Arabic administrative division that can be translated as "district", "sub-district" or "municipality". The plural is baladiyat. Grammatically, it is the feminine of   "rural, country-, folk-".

The Arabic term amanah is also used for "municipality".

Arab countries

Sets

Other
 Western Region Municipality
 Dubai Municipality
 Unaizah Municipality

Turkish

In Turkish, the word belediye (definite accusative belediyesi), which is a loan from Arabic, means "municipality" or "city council".

See also
 Opshtina

References 

Types of administrative division